The Thulin K was a Swedish naval fighter aircraft in the 1910s. It was operated by both the Swedish and Dutch armed forces.

Development

Dr. Enoch Thulin, of AB Thulinverken, designed the Thulin K in December 1916. It was a shoulder-wing monoplane of wooden construction employing wing warping for lateral control. Powered by a 90 hp Thulin A Gnôme derived rotary engine, it could be configured as a single seat or tandem seat aircraft.

Operational history
After initial flights in early 1917, the Swedish Army purchased two of the single seat K versions. However, it was more successful as an export plane; the Royal Netherlands Navy bought twelve Ks between 1917 and 1918 and three Thulin KAs. Both types were delivered without armament but the Dutch Navy fitted theirs with machine guns firing through the propeller arc and also experimented with 20 mm Madson cannons.

The aircraft's performance was good - Thulin himself broke the Swedish altitude record in it in 1919. However, on 14 May 1919 Thulin's own Thulin K lost an aileron in a steep dive, crashing and killing him. The rest of the Thulin Ks were written off in 1920 and the Thulin KAs were withdrawn in 1922.

Variants
Thulin K
Single-seat production variant, two built for Flygcompaniet and twelve for the Dutch Navy.
Thulin KA
Two-seat version for the Royal Netherlands Navy, three built.

Operators

Swedish Air Force

Specifications (Thulin K)

References

External links

Thulin type K Swedish fighter from 1917

1910s Swedish fighter aircraft
Shoulder-wing aircraft
Single-engined tractor aircraft
Aircraft first flown in 1917
Rotary-engined aircraft